The Jewish Museum is an art museum and repository of cultural artifacts, housed at 1109 Fifth Avenue, in the former Felix M. Warburg House, along Museum Mile on the Upper East Side of Manhattan, New York City. The first Jewish museum in the United States, as well as the oldest existing Jewish museum in the world, it contains the largest collection of art and Jewish culture excluding Israeli museums, more than 30,000 objects. While its collection was established in 1904 at the Jewish Theological Seminary of America, the museum did not open to the public until 1947 when Felix Warburg's widow sold the property to the Seminary. It focuses both on artifacts of Jewish history and on modern and contemporary art. The museum's collection exhibition, Scenes from the Collection, is supplemented by multiple temporary exhibitions each year.

History

The collection that seeded the museum began with a gift of Jewish ceremonial art objects from Judge Mayer Sulzberger to the Jewish Theological Seminary of America on January 20, 1904, where it was housed in the seminary's library. The collection was moved in 1931, with the Seminary, to 122nd and Broadway. The Jewish Theological Seminary received over 400 Jewish ceremonial items and created, 'The Museum of Jewish Ceremonial Objects', previously the Jacob Schiff Library. The collection was subsequently expanded by major donations from Hadji Ephraim Benguiat and Harry G. Friedman. In 1939, in light of WWII, Poland sent about 350 objects to New York city from homes and synagogues in order to preserve them.

Following Felix Warburg's death in 1937, in January 1944 his widow Frieda donated the family mansion to the seminary as a permanent home for the museum, and the site opened to the public as 'The Jewish Museum' in May 1947. Frieda Warburg said at the opening that the museum would not be a somber memorial, but rather a celebration of the Jewish faith and traditions. The first expansion of the museum was the addition of a sculpture garden in 1959 by Adam List. The building was expanded in 1963 and further by architect Kevin Roche in 1993.

In the 1960s, the museum took a more active role in the general world of contemporary art, with exhibitions such as Primary Structures, which helped to launch the Minimalist art movement. In the decades since, the museum has had a renewed focus on Jewish culture and Jewish artists. From 1990 through 1993, director Joan Rosenbaum led the project to renovate and expand the building and carry out the museum's first major capital campaign, of $60 million. The project, designed by architect Kevin Roche, doubled the size of the museum, providing it with a seven-story addition. In 1992, the Jewish Museum and the Film Society of Lincoln Center teamed up to create The New York Jewish Film Festival, which presents narrative features, short films and documentaries.

Today, the museum also provides educational programs for adults and families, organizing concerts, films, symposiums and lectures related to its exhibitions. Joan Rosenbaum was the museum's director from 1981 until her retirement in 2010. In 2006, the museum broke with its longstanding policy of being closed for Sabbath observance by offering free of charge public admission on Saturdays.

In 2011 the museum named Claudia Gould as its new director. In 2012 Claudia Gould hired Jens Hoffmann Deputy Director, Exhibitions and Public Programs. In early December 2017, the Jewish Museum suspended Hoffmann from his position following allegations of sexual harassment leveled against him by multiple staff members. In the wake of that decision, the Honolulu Biennial cut its ties with Hoffmann, the Museum of Contemporary Art Detroit suspended him from his role as chief curator at large (a position from which he resigned later that month) and the Kadist Art Foundation similarly suspended him from his position as curator and adviser. The 3rd People's Biennial was supposed to take place at the Indianapolis Museum of Contemporary Art in 2019, with Hoffmann co-directing; however, the museum suspended its involvement with Hoffmann after the sexual harassment allegations at the Jewish Museum were not resolved. On December 17, 2017, the Jewish Museum terminated Hoffmann after a review of the allegations. Hoffmann denied "knowingly or purposefully [behaving] in a bullying, intimidating, harassing, or sexually inappropriate manner."

In 2022, Yale University historian Michael Casper criticized the museum's exhibition on Jonas Mekas for its lack of treatment of Mekas's role in editing two pro-Nazi newspapers during World War II. Cultural historian Jeffrey Shandler told the Jewish Telegraphic Agency, “It would be problematic anywhere, in any museum. But I think it is doubly so in a Jewish museum. It really raises questions about their understanding of their mission.”

Architecture

The Felix M. Warburg House was constructed in François I (or châteauesque) style, 1906-1908 for Felix and Frieda Warburg, designed by C.P.H. Gilbert. François I style was originally found in New York City in the late 19th century through the works of Richard Morris Hunt. Hunt was a renowned architect throughout the Northeast, particularly in New England and was one of the first American architects to study at the elite Ecole des Beaux-Arts in Paris, France. C.P.H. Gilbert was an apprentice of Hunt and emulated Hunt's classic Châteauesque style for the Warburg house while also adding some Gothic features. The original house is built in limestone with mansard roofs, dripping moldings, and gables. This architectural style was based on French revivalism and exuded wealth, a point which Felix Warburg wanted to make to his neighbors. It featured a green yard in front of the house, which was later converted into the museum's entrance.

Renovations

Once converted into a museum, the architect Kevin Roche, who also designed additions to the Metropolitan Museum of Art, was selected to design additions to the Jewish Museum. After $36 million, the development of 11,000 more square feet of exhibition space, and two and a half years, Roche finished his additions in June 1993. He intended his additions to be a continuation of the museum's Gothic revival features. This is especially clear in the Fifth Avenue facade and the auditorium. The Fifth Avenue facade, made of Indiana limestone, is carved in Gothic revival style. The auditorium is set in a retrofitted Gothic revival style ballroom and finds uses for the mansion's stained-glass dome and screen. The cafe in the basement has stained glass windows.

Although these additions that were intended as a continuation of the museum's Gothic revival features, Roche also included additions that were meant to prevent the museum from appearing outdated and modernizing the facilities. For instance, Roche ensured that the education center and the auditorium would have the appropriate technology for their purposes, such as interactive visual displays.

Collections

The museum has nearly 30,000 objects including paintings, sculptures, archaeological artifacts, Jewish ceremonial art and many other pieces important to the preservation of Jewish history and culture. Artists included in the museum's collection include James Tissot, Marc Chagall, George Segal, Eleanor Antin and Deborah Kass. This represents the largest collection of Jewish art, Judaica and broadcast media outside of museums in Israel. It has a collection exhibition called Scenes from the Collection, which displays works of art from antiquity to the present. The museum's collection includes objects from ancient to modern eras, in all media, and originated in every area of the world where Jews have had a presence.

Highlights

Man Ray, Self-Portrait with Camera, 1930
Andy Warhol, Ten Portraits of Jews of the 20th Century, 1980
Eva Hesse, Untitled, 1963–64
Richard Avedon, Jacob Israel Avedon portraits, 1969–73
Adolph Gottlieb, Return of the Mariner, 1946
Deborah Kass, Double Red Yentl, Split, from My Elvis series, 1993
Jan Pogorzelski, Hanukkah menorah, 1893
James Tissot, Adam and Eve Driven From Paradise, c. 1896–1902
Alfred Stieglitz, The Steerage, 1907
Reuven Rubin, Goldfish Vendor, 1928
Marc Chagall, Old Man with Beard, c. 1931
Johann Adam Boller Hanukkah menorah, Frankfurt am Main (Germany), 1706–32
Torah Ark from Adath Yeshurun Synagogue, Abraham Shulkin, 1899

Selected art exhibitions

Some of the museum's important exhibitions have included:

Primary Structures (1966) 
The Circle of Montparnasse: Jewish Artists in Paris, 1905–1945 (1985)
The Dreyfus Affair: Art, Truth, and Justice (1987)
Painting a Place in America: Jewish Artists in New York, 1900–1945 (1991)
Too Jewish?: Challenging Traditional Identities (1996)
Assignment: Rescue, The Story of Varian Fry and the Emergency Rescue Committee (1997)
An Expressionist in Paris: The Paintings of Chaïm Soutine (1998)
Voice, Image, Gesture: Selections from The Jewish Museum's Collection, 1945–2000 (2001)
Mirroring Evil: Nazi Imagery/Recent Art (2002)
New York: Capital of Photography (2002)
Modigliani Beyond the Myth (2004)
Eva Hesse: Sculpture (2006)
Action/Abstraction: Pollock, de Kooning, and American Art, 1940-1976 (2008)
Shifting the Gaze: Painting and Feminism (2010–2011)
Harry Houdini: Art and Magic (2010–2011)
Maira Kalman: Various Illuminations (of a Crazy World) (2011)
Collecting Matisse and Modern Masters: The Cone sisters of Baltimore (2011)
The Radical Camera: New York's Photo League, 1936-1951 (2012)
The Snowy Day and the Art of Ezra Jack Keats (2012)
Kehinde Wiley / The World Stage: Israel (2012)
Édouard Vuillard: A Painter and His Muses, 1890-1940 (2012)
"Crossing Borders: Manuscripts from the Bodleian Library" (September 14, 2012 – February 3, 2013)
"Sharon Lockhart  Noa Eshkol" (November 2, 2012 – March 24, 2013)
Revolution of the Eye: Modern Art and the Birth of American Television (May 1 to September 27, 2015)
"Pierre Chareau: Modern Architecture and Design" (November 4, 2016 – March 24, 2017)
"Chagall, Lissitzky, Malevich: The Russian Avant-Garde in Vitebsk, 1918-1922" (September 14, 2018 – January 6, 2019)
 "The Sassoons" Exhibit from March 3 to August 13, 2023. Review in The New York Times. Review in The Wall Street Journal.

Gallery
∆

Programs
The Jewish Museum has a vast array of public educational programs which include talks and lectures, performances, hands on art making, group visits, specialist programming for visitors with disabilities, and resources for Pre-K-12 teachers. Programming for visitors with disabilities can take a unique and special form, with exclusive access to the museum one day a month for a program like the Verbal Description Tour. Participants are guided around sections of the empty museum by an art educator, who provides detailed, verbal descriptions of the art work, shares touch objects, and encourages discussion amongst the visitors. One participant described the ability to touch the art work as "...an honor, to be able to touch it. It felt like we were doing something so special, that other people can't do. So it actually creates an experience where you feel a connection to the art."

Programming at the Jewish Museum caters for many different constituents, from live musical performances to events specifically curated for children, and families. Events can be co-sponsored or in conjunction with other museums, particularly those located nearby on the Museum Mile (Manhattan). Part of the goal of family programming is to help foster a younger audience for the museum, with Sunday being "family day", with a variety of activities on offer including gallery tours, free art workshops and parent-children storybook readings. Activities are designed to cross cultures, and explore subjects that can appeal to any race or religion, such as archaeological digs or an examination of color and impressionistic landscapes.

Management
As of 2013, the Jewish Museum operates on a $17 million annual budget. Under Joan Rosenbaum's leadership the museum's collection grew to 26,000 objects, its endowment to more than $92 million and its annual operating budget to $15 million from $1 million in 1981. Rosenbaum chose to emphasize the Jewish side of the museum's identity, creating the permanent exhibition "Culture and Continuity: The Jewish Journey," while also mounting shows of modern Jewish artists such as Chaïm Soutine and contemporary artists such as Maira Kalman. In 2013, the museum's board chose Claudia Gould, former director of the Institute of Contemporary Art, Philadelphia, as its new director.

In 2015 Kelly Taxter was named one of the top 25 female curators in the world by ArtNet.

See also
Jews in New York City
List of museums and cultural institutions in New York City

References

External links

"Current Exhibitions" at the Jewish Museum website
"Past Exhibitions" at the Jewish Museum website
Jewish Museum (Manhattan) within Google Arts & Culture

Jews and Judaism in Manhattan
Jewish museums in New York City
Art museums established in 1904
Gothic Revival architecture in New York City
Museums in Manhattan
Society museums in New York (state)
Art museums and galleries in New York City
1904 establishments in New York City
Upper East Side
Fifth Avenue
Jewish Theological Seminary of America